The Victor H. and Marta Jorgensen House is a house located in southwest Portland, Oregon, listed on the National Register of Historic Places.

See also
 National Register of Historic Places listings in Southwest Portland, Oregon

References

Houses on the National Register of Historic Places in Portland, Oregon
Houses completed in 1929
1929 establishments in Oregon
Modern Movement architecture in the United States
Herman Brookman buildings
Southwest Hills, Portland, Oregon